Sugarloaf Regional Airport is a public use airport in Franklin County, Maine, United States. It is owned by the Town of Carrabassett Valley and is located one nautical mile (1.85 km) north of the central business district.

Facilities and aircraft 
It has one runway designated 17/35 with an asphalt surface measuring 2,800 by 75 feet (853 x 23 m).

For the 12-month period ending August 25, 2006, the airport had 6,000 aircraft operations, an average of 16 per day: 100% general aviation. At that time there were 11 aircraft based at this airport: 100% single-engine.

References

External links 
 Aerial photo as of May 1998 from USGS The National Map via MSR Maps
 

Airports in Maine
Transportation buildings and structures in Franklin County, Maine